The 1983 U.S. National Indoor Championships was a men's tennis tournament played on indoor carpet courts that was part of the 1983 Volvo Grand Prix.It was the 13th edition of the tournament and was played at the Racquet Club of Memphis in Memphis, Tennessee in the United States from February 14 through February 20, 1983. First-seeded Jimmy Connors won the singles title, his sixth at the event, improving the record he held jointly with Wylie C. Grant.

Finals

Singles
 Jimmy Connors defeated  Gene Mayer 7–5, 6–0
 It was Connors' 1st singles title of the year and the 97th of his career.

Doubles
 Peter McNamara /  Paul McNamee defeated  Tim Gullikson /  Tom Gullikson 6–3, 5–7, 6–4

References

External links
 ITF tournament edition details

U.S. National Indoor
U.S. National Indoor Championships
Carpet court tennis tournaments
Indoor tennis tournaments
Tennis tournaments in the United States
U.S. National Indoor Tennis Championships
U.S. National Indoor Tennis Championships
U.S. National Indoor Tennis Championships